Gladiators of Rome (Italian: Gladiatori di Roma) is a 2012 Italian computer-animated comedy film produced by Rainbow, a studio co-owned by Iginio Straffi and Viacom at the time. Viacom's Paramount Pictures released the film in North America while Medusa Film handled distribution in Italy. The film was directed by Straffi, who also co-wrote the screenplay with Michael J. Wilson. Gladiators of Rome had its world premiere in Italy on 18 October 2012.

While conceiving the idea for the film, Iginio Straffi chose to write about ancient Rome so that he could set the story in Italy while still appealing to an international audience. Gladiators of Rome is a spoof of serious films about gladiators, which Straffi said "easily lend themselves to parody." Paramount Pictures (the film unit of Viacom, which co-owns Rainbow) worked with the Italian team on both the casting and story for the film; Paramount asked for certain scenes to be changed for American audiences. The project was in development for over five years and became one of the most expensive Italian films ever made. Its production budget alone was estimated to be around $45–55 million in U.S. dollars, with promotion and advertising costs bringing its total to almost $80 million (70 million euros).

The film was a box-office bomb, grossing just 818,913 euros in its opening weekend. Triboo Media's Federico Boni wrote that "there could not have been a worse opening for the 'blockbuster.'" According to Box Office Mojo, the film ended its theatrical release with about $10 million worldwide. In 2016, Straffi presumed that the poor performance of the film was a result of the Rainbow studio's lack of experience with cinema.

Plot
It is the age of Imperial Rome. Young Timo is an orphan of Pompeii's terrible eruption, adopted by general Chirone and raised in the most famous Gladiators' Academy in Rome. However, Timo is not exactly gladiator material. He just wants to hang out with his friends, Ciccius and Mauritius, and avoid his stepfather's bizarre training sessions at all costs. When Timo meets the lovely Lucilla, he decides to change his life and bring out the valor inside himself - valor that has never shown itself before. Through spells, crazy raids in the woods and the terrible trainings of a very personal lady trainer, Timo has to transform himself into the greatest gladiator of all time. And as they say, if "fortune favors the bold" in Rome hard times are awaiting for Timo and the gang.

Voice cast

Production
In November 2007, Iginio Straffi first mentioned that he was working with Michael J. Wilson on a comedy film, but it was "still a top-secret topic." The film was officially announced in October 2008 under the working title Versus Roma. It was tentatively scheduled for a release date in 2010.

Soundtrack
"You Spin Me Round (Like a Record)"
"The Final Countdown"
"The Best"
"Symphony No. 5"
"Everyday"
"Tears and Rain" - James Blunt

References

External links
 

2012 films
Italian 3D films
Italian fantasy comedy films
Italian animated films
2010s children's fantasy films
2010s fantasy comedy films
Animated comedy films
Films set in Rome
Films set in the Roman Empire
Films set in the 1st century
2010s Italian-language films
2012 computer-animated films
Films about gladiatorial combat
2012 comedy films
Rainbow S.r.l. films
Films directed by Iginio Straffi
Films produced by Iginio Straffi
Films with screenplays by Iginio Straffi
Films scored by Bruno Zambrini
2010s English-language films